Pierre Delbet (15 November 1861 – 17 July 1957) was a French surgeon born in La Ferté-Gaucher.

Biography

In 1889 he received his medical doctorate, and in 1909 became a professor of clinical surgery in Paris. In 1921 he became a member of the Académie de Médecine. 

Delbet is remembered for his advocacy of magnesium chloride. During World War I, Delbet was searching for a solution that could cleanse wounds but not damage tissue as traditional antiseptics did. In 1915 he found that magnesium chloride not only worked as an antiseptic but was also harmless to body tissue. Serendipitously, he discovered that when the magnesium chloride solution was taken orally or intravenously, it appeared to be a remedy for other ailments. Delbet also believed that magnesium was beneficial to the efficiency of white blood cells, of which he described in his treatise "Politique Préventive du Cancer".

With Jean-François-Auguste Le Dentu (1841-1926) and others, he was co-publisher of the multi-volume Traité de chirurgie clinique et opératoire (1901 et seq.).

Selected writings 
 Clinique chirurgicale, with Ulysse Trélat; 2 volumes, Paris, 1891.
 Précis d’anatomie topographique, with Nikolaus Rüdinger; Paris, 1893.
 Asepsie opératoire, with L Bigeard. Paris, 1901. - Aseptic surgery
 Chirurgie artérielle et veineuse, Paris, 1906. - Arterial and venous surgery.
 Névralgies du trijumeau, with Maurice Chevassu; Paris, 1911. - Trigeminal neuralgia.
 Méthode du traitement des fractures, Paris, 1916.

References

External links
 
 Pierre Delbet @ Who Named It
  Essay on Delbet and Magnesium Chloride Hexahydrate

1861 births
1957 deaths
French surgeons
People from Seine-et-Marne